Aulin may refer to:

People
 Ewa Aulin (born 1950) Swedish actress
 Jared Aulin (born 1982), Canadian professional hockey centre
 Tor Aulin (1866–1914), Swedish violinist, conductor and composer
 Valborg Aulin (1860–1928), Swedish pianist and composer

Other uses
 Glen Aulin, a segment of the Tuolumne River valley, upriver from the Grand Canyon of the Tuolumne
 Aulin, a brand name for Nimesulide